1056 Azalea, provisional designation , is a stony Florian asteroid from the inner regions of the asteroid belt, approximately 12 kilometers in diameter. It was discovered on 31 January 1924, by astronomer Karl Reinmuth at the Heidelberg-Königstuhl State Observatory in southwest Germany. The asteroid is named after the Azalea flower.

Orbit and classification 

Azalea is a member of the Flora family, a giant asteroid family and the largest family of stony asteroids in the main belt. It orbits the Sun in the inner main belt at a distance of 1.8–2.6 AU once every 3 years and 4 months (1,216 days). Its orbit has an eccentricity of 0.18 and an inclination of 5° with respect to the ecliptic. The body's observation arc begins at Heidelberg in April 1928, more than 4 years after its official discovery observation.

Physical characteristics 

In the SMASS classification, Azalea is a common stony S-type asteroid.

Rotation period 

In 2004, two rotational lightcurves of Azalea were obtained from photometric observations by a group of predominately Polish astronomers including Agnieszka Kryszczyńska, as well as by astronomers Alain Klotz and Raoul Behrend. Lightcurve analysis gave a rotation period of 15.03 and 15.15 hours with a high brightness variation of 0.70 and 0.79 magnitude, respectively. The high brightness amplitude is typically indicative for a non-spheroidal shape.

Spin axis 

In 2013, an international study modeled a lightcurve with a concurring period of 15.0276 hours and found two spin axis of (252.0°, 51.0°) and (64.0°, 41.0°) in ecliptic coordinates (λ, β).

Diameter and albedo 

According to the surveys carried out by the Japanese Akari satellite and the NEOWISE mission of NASA's Wide-field Infrared Survey Explorer, Azalea measures between 10.66 and 13.07 kilometers in diameter and its surface has an albedo between 0.223 and 0.34.

The Collaborative Asteroid Lightcurve Link assumes an albedo of 0.24 – derived from 8 Flora, the largest member and namesake of the Flora family – and calculates a diameter of 12.40 kilometers based on an absolute magnitude of 11.7.

Naming 

This minor planet was named after the genus of flowering shrubs, Azalea, which are rhododendrons with funnel-shaped corollas. The official naming citation was mentioned in The Names of the Minor Planets by Paul Herget in 1955.

References

External links 
 Asteroid Lightcurve Database (LCDB), query form (info )
 Dictionary of Minor Planet Names, Google books
 Asteroids and comets rotation curves, CdR – Observatoire de Genève, Raoul Behrend
 Discovery Circumstances: Numbered Minor Planets (1)-(5000) – Minor Planet Center
 
 

001056
Discoveries by Karl Wilhelm Reinmuth
Named minor planets
001056
19240131